Gloria Vitanza Basile (June 29, 1929  September 29, 2004) was an American novelist and songwriter.

She was born in Westfield, New York, in 1929 to Sicilian immigrant parents. She studied at San Jose University and the University of California - Los Angeles. Before she began her writing career, she owned and managed a women's clothing shop. She published 13 best-selling novels, mainly romantic thrillers and later science fiction. She also wrote the song, "Ballad of One-Eyed Jacks," for the film, One-Eyed Jacks (1961), starring Marlon Brando.

Her best known novel is The Godson (1976), later renamed House of Lions, about a Mafia family; at the time, this was an unusual topic for women writers. In an interview, Basile said her childhood experiences with prejudice against Sicilians inspired her to research her roots, and resulted in The Godson and another novel, Appassionato (1978), set in post-war Sicily.

She published two novels under the pen name Michaela Morgan.

Works 
 The Godson / House of Lions (1976)
 Appassionato (1978)
 The Manipulators Trilogy
 The Manipulators (1979)
 Born to Power (1979)
 Giants in the Shadows (1979)
 Marco (1980)
 Francesca (1981)
 Global 2000 Trilogy
 Eye of the Eagle (1983)
 The Jackal Helix (1984)
 The Sting of the Scorpion (1984)
 Iago, Phaedra 
 Aurora
 Bethaynia

As Michaela Morgan:
 Zanzara (1978)
 Madelaina (1979)

References 

1929 births
2004 deaths
People from Westfield, New York
San Jose State University alumni
University of California, Los Angeles alumni
20th-century American writers
20th-century American women writers
American writers of Italian descent
21st-century American women